Barkatullah Khan Stadium is located in Jodhpur, Rajasthan. Named for the 6th chief minister of Rajasthan, the stadium is currently used mostly for cricket.

The stadium was established in 1986 but has been used only sporadically. The stadium's current capacity is 30,000 people and the ends are called Cox Cutir End and Residency Road End. It became India's 35th ground to host a one-dayer, while Jodhpur became India's 31st venue to host an ODI.

Now this ground has flood lights fitted by GE electric and capacity is enhanced up to 30,000 after seats were installed and world class newly developed team dressing rooms, also new stands for camera to set best live coverage.

In 2020, It was announced by RCA President for redevelopment of the stadium for upcoming IPL 2021 and for international matches. In 2021 Rajasthan Budget, Rs.20 Crore were allocated for redevelopment of the stadium by Chief Minister Of
Rajasthan Ashok Gehlot.

Cricket returned after nearly 20 years in Jodhpur with Legends League Cricket 2022. The last time a match was played between India and West Indies at this ground was on 21 November 2002.

List of International Matches

ODI

T20

Records & Trivia
{| class="wikitable"
|-
! Category
! Information
|-
| Highest Team Score
|  Zimbabwe (284/9 in 49.5 Overs against India)
|-
| Lowest Team Score
| West Indies (259/7 in 50 Overs against India)
|-
| Best Batting Performance
| Sachin Tendulkar (146 Runs against Zimbabwe)
|-
| Best Bowling Performance
| Ajit Agarkar (3/24 against West Indies)
|}

Sachin Tendulkar slammed  first century with 146 against Zimbabwe on home soil in the third one-dayer. It was also his highest score against the African nation.

Zaheer Khan made the Indian record of scoring most runs in a single over in one-dayers at this venue. The 50th over of Indian innings bowled by Henry Olonga cost 27 runs with 25 coming off Zaheer's bat. Ajit Agarkar grabbed his 100th wicket in his 67th match and became only the seventh Indian to do so.

One Day Internationals

References

External links
  Cricinfo Website - Ground Page
 Cricketarchive Website - Ground Page

Sports venues in Jodhpur
Cricket grounds in Rajasthan
1986 establishments in Rajasthan